Russell Leroy McQueen (born January 9, 1953) is an American baseball pitcher who is most notable for winning the 1972 College World Series Most Outstanding Player award while a sophomore at University of Southern California. He is one of seven players from University of Southern California to win that award. The others are Bill Thom, Bud Hollowell, Bill Seinsoth, George Milke, Rod Boxberger and Wes Rachels. In the 1972 College World Series, he had a string of 14 consecutive scoreless innings.

On March 30, 1974, he pitched a no-hitter. That was the first game ever played at Dedeaux Field.

Following his collegiate career, he was drafted by the California Angels in the 14th round of the 1974 amateur draft. He played two seasons in their minor league system, 1975 and 1976, never reaching the majors. In 1975, he played for the Salinas Packers, going 6–5 with a 3.16 ERA in 54 relief appearances. In 1976, he played for the Packers and El Paso Diablos, going 3–2 with a 2.54 ERA in 26 games with the Packers and 0–2 in 15 games with a 4.62 ERA with the Diablos.

He graduated from the University of Southern California's Marshall School of Business in 1974.

References

USC Trojans baseball players
1953 births
College World Series Most Outstanding Player Award winners
Living people
Marshall School of Business alumni